A car is a wheeled motor vehicle used for transporting passengers.

Car(s), CAR(s), or The Car(s) may also refer to:

Computing
 C.a.R. (Z.u.L.), geometry software
 CAR and CDR, commands in LISP computer programming
 Clock with Adaptive Replacement, a page replacement algorithm
 Computer-assisted reporting
 Computer-assisted reviewing

Economics
 Capital adequacy ratio, a ratio of a bank's capital to its risk
 Cost accrual ratio, an accounting formula
 Cumulative abnormal return
 Cumulative average return, a financial concept related to the time value of money

Film and television
 Cars (franchise), a Disney/Pixar film series
 Cars (film), a 2006 computer animated film from Disney and Pixar
 The Car, a 1977 suspense-horror film
 Car, a BBC Two television ident first aired in 1993 (see BBC Two '1991–2001' idents)
 The Car (1997 film), a Malayalam film
 "The Car" (The Assistants episode)

Literature
 Car (magazine), a British auto-enthusiast publication
 The Car (novel), a novel by Gary Paulsen

Military
 Canadian Airborne Regiment, a Canadian Forces formation
 Colt Automatic Rifle, a 5.56mm NATO firearm
 Combat Action Ribbon, a United States military decoration
 U.S. Army Combat Arms Regimental System, a 1950s reorganisation of the regiments of the US Army

Music
 The Cars, an American rock band

Albums
 Peter Gabriel (1977 album) or Car
 The Cars (album), a 1978 album by The Cars
 Cars (soundtrack), the soundtrack to the 2006 film
 Cars (Now, Now Every Children album), 2009
 Cars, a 2011 album by Kris Delmhorst
 C.A.R. (album), a 2012 album by Serengeti
 The Car (album), a 2022 album by Arctic Monkeys

Songs
 "The Car" (song), a song by Jeff Carson
 "Cars" (song), a 1979 single by Gary Numan
 "Car", a 1994 song by Built to Spill from There's Nothing Wrong with Love

Paintings
 Cars (painting), a series of paintings by Andy Warhol
 The Car (Brack), a 1955 painting by John Brack

People
 Car (surname)
 Cars (surname)

Places
 Car, Azerbaijan, a village
 Čar, a village in Serbia
 Cars, Gironde, France, a commune
 Les Cars, Haute-Vienne, France, a commune
 Central African Republic
 Central Asian Republics
 Cordillera Administrative Region, Philippines
 County Carlow, Ireland, Chapman code

Science
 Canonical anticommutation relation
 Carina (constellation)
 Chimeric antigen receptor, artificial T cell receptors
 Coherent anti-Stokes Raman spectroscopy
 Constitutive androstane receptor
 Cortisol awakening response, on waking from sleep
 Coxsackievirus and adenovirus receptor, a protein

Sports
 Carolina Hurricanes, a National Hockey League team
 Carolina Panthers, a National Football League team
 Club Always Ready, a Bolivian football club from La Paz
 Rugby Africa, formerly known as Confederation of African Rugby

Transportation
 Railroad car
 Canada Atlantic Railway, 1879–1914
 Canadian Atlantic Railway, 1986–1994
 Carlisle railway station's station code
 Car, the cab of an elevator
 Car, a tram, streetcar, or trolley car

Other uses

Car
 Car (Greek myth), one or two figures in Greek mythology
 Car language, an Austroasiatic language of the Nicobar Islands in the eastern Indian Ocean
 car, ISO 639-2 and ISO 639-3 codes of the Carib language, spoken by the Kalina people of South America
 Cars (video game), a 2006 video game based on the film
 Chimeric antigen receptor, a type of protein engineered to give T cells the ability to target a specific protein

CAR
 Canadian Aviation Regulations
 Avis Budget Group (Nasdaq: CAR)
 Central apparatus room, an equipment room found at broadcasting facilities
 Children of the American Revolution, a genealogical society
  or Action Committee for Renewal, a political party of Togo
 Council for Aboriginal Reconciliation, body founded by the Australian Government in 1991 as part of its Reconciliation in Australia policy
 Council for Aboriginal Rights (1951–1980s), Victoria, Australia
 Criminal Appeal Reports, law reports in the United Kingdom

See also

 Carr (disambiguation)
 CARS (disambiguation)
 Le Car (disambiguation)
 iCar